Steve Livingston is an American politician. A Republican, he has served as a member of the Alabama State Senate from the 8th District since January 2015.

In May 2019, he voted to make abortion a crime at any stage in a pregnancy, with no exemptions for cases of rape or incest.

References

External links
 Biography at Alabama Legislature

Living people
Republican Party Alabama state senators
21st-century American politicians
Year of birth missing (living people)